The Arup S-2 was the first commercial development of Cloyd Snyder's Arup S-1 low aspect ratio wing aircraft.

Design
The Arup S-2 featured a straight leading edge wing with a trailing edge that tapered to the rear of the aircraft giving it a guitar pick shape when viewed from above. An M6 airfoil was chosen over its predecessor's sharp edged, modified Clark-Y airfoil. The large trailing edge control surfaces were mixed for pitch and roll control, but were assisted by small, movable, semi-circular wingtips that could provide additional roll control. Conventional landing gear was used, faired with wheel pants. The access to the cockpit was from a belly mounted hatch. Visibility was enhanced with celluloid panels on the aircraft's belly.

Operational history
The prototype S-2 was test flown by Glen Doolittle. The STOL aircraft could fly at up to 35 degrees angle of attack without stalling. The aircraft was demonstrated across the country at events like the Indianapolis 500 and the 1933 National Air Races. Later it was demonstrated to the Army, NACA and CAA in Washington. D.C. Raoul Hoffman left Arup after the development of the S-2 to create his own design, the Hoffman Flying Wing. Engineer Charles H. Zimmerman viewed the S-2 trials in Washington and later applied the principles to the Vought XF5U program.

The S-2 was sold without an engine to a stuntman, F.F. Bowser Frakes, who performed air crashes at fairs. A Szekely radial engine removed from an American Eagle Eaglet was installed on the S-2, but did not perform well. A propeller was acquired from Milt Hatfield, who sourced the landing gear for the first S-1. Hatfield demonstrated how to fly the aircraft and it was eventually crashed in a show.

Contrary to reports of it being destroyed, in 2015 the Mid-Atlantic Air Museum reported via their facebook page in 2015 that it had acquired the original Arup S-2. No further information has been added, but their collection page shows it.
maam.org

Airworthy reproductions
The Old Rhinebeck Aerodrome's veteran airshow pilot Kenwood Cassens is in the process of building a full-scale airworthy reproduction of the S-2, meant to be powered by a Continental A-40 boxer-four air-cooled engine.

Specifications (Arup S-2)

See also

References

External links
 Video of the S-2 in flight

Flying wings
Mid-wing aircraft
Single-engined tractor aircraft
Aircraft first flown in 1933
1930s United States experimental aircraft